Damià Abella Pérez (born 15 April 1982), known simply as Damià, is a Spanish retired professional footballer who played as a full back.

After starting out at Barcelona, he went on to amass La Liga totals of 198 matches and five goals during nine seasons, also representing in the competition Racing de Santander, Betis and Osasuna. He also spent two years in England, with Middlesbrough.

Club career

Barcelona
Born in Olot, Girona, Catalonia, Damià's first professional club was local UE Figueres, for whom he played during the 2003–04 season, in Segunda División B. He was subsequently acquired by national giants FC Barcelona, being incorporated to its B-side.

Due to many injuries to the main squad, Damià made his La Liga debut for Barça's first team against Athletic Bilbao on 30 October 2004, playing 90 minutes in a 1–1 away draw as right back. However, he could never break into the main squad, finishing the campaign with nine top flight appearances while continuing to appear for the reserves.

In January 2006, Damià joined Racing de Santander on a one-and-a-half-year loan deal. He mainly operated at the position he knew from Barcelona B, right midfielder, and scored his first top level goal on 12 February in a 2–0 success at RCD Espanyol, eventually helping the Cantabrians narrowly avoid top level relegation (15 starts, 1,371 minutes of play).

Betis
During the summer of 2006, Real Betis signed Damià on a five-year contract for €1 million. Although Racing had agreed with Barcelona that the player would stay with them for the duration of the loan arrangement, they decided not to block the move. However, a serious hip injury, contracted while still with Racing, meant that he would be unregistered for the entire length of 2006–07; he made his competitive debut on 30 September 2007, playing as right back in a 3–0 win over RCD Mallorca after having successfully undergone surgery in the United States.

Damià netted his first goals for the Andalusians in 2008–09, in consecutive matches early into the campaign (1–2 loss at Villarreal CF, 3–0 home win against Mallorca), but the club suffered relegation after nine years.

Osasuna
In late July 2010, after Betis' unsuccessful attempt in regaining their top division status, Damià signed with CA Osasuna. He went on to compete in several seasons in that tier, exclusively as a defender.

Middlesbrough
On 16 August 2014, Damià joined Middlesbrough of the Football League Championship on a free transfer, signed by countryman Aitor Karanka. He received international clearance just hours before his debut against Leeds United at Elland Road, playing the full 90 minutes in a 0–1 defeat.

Damià left the Riverside Stadium in May 2016, upon the expiration of his contract. He appeared in only seven competitive games during his spell, and decided to retire at 34 soon afterwards.

Honours
Barcelona
La Liga: 2004–05

References

External links

1982 births
Living people
People from Olot
Sportspeople from the Province of Girona
Spanish footballers
Footballers from Catalonia
Association football defenders
Association football midfielders
Association football utility players
La Liga players
Segunda División players
Segunda División B players
CF Peralada players
UE Figueres footballers
FC Barcelona Atlètic players
FC Barcelona players
Racing de Santander players
Real Betis players
CA Osasuna players
English Football League players
Middlesbrough F.C. players
Catalonia international footballers
Spanish expatriate footballers
Expatriate footballers in England
Spanish expatriate sportspeople in England